Aristotelis ("Aris") Gavelas (born 10 November 1978) is a retired Greek sprinter who specialized in the 100 metres.

He finished sixth at the 2002 European Championships and won the gold medal at the 2001 Mediterranean Games, the latter in a career best time of 10.14 seconds. In Greece only Angelos Pavlakakis has run faster. Gavelas also competed at the 2003 World Indoor Championships without reaching the finals.

Honours

References

1978 births
Living people
Greek male sprinters
Mediterranean Games gold medalists for Greece
Athletes (track and field) at the 2001 Mediterranean Games
Mediterranean Games medalists in athletics
21st-century Greek people